Englesqueville-en-Auge (literally Englesqueville in Auge) is a commune in the Calvados department in the Normandy region in northwestern France.

Population

See also
Englesqueville-la-Percée
Communes of the Calvados department

References

Communes of Calvados (department)
Calvados communes articles needing translation from French Wikipedia